Dindicodes euclidiaria is a moth of the family Geometridae first described by Charles Oberthür in 1913. It is found in Tibet.

References

Moths described in 1913
Pseudoterpnini